Incasoctenus is a monotypic genus of South American araneomorph spiders in the family Xenoctenidae, containing the single species, Incasoctenus perplexus. It was first described by Cândido Firmino de Mello-Leitão in 1942, and has only been found in Peru and only the female is known. Originally placed with the wandering spiders, it was moved to the Xenoctenidae in 2017.

References

Xenoctenidae
Monotypic Araneomorphae genera
Spiders of South America
Taxa named by Cândido Firmino de Mello-Leitão